"I Could Make You Love Me" is a song from Australian pop group Wa Wa Nee. The song was released in August 1986 as the second single from their self-titled debut studio album. The song peaked at number 5 on the Australian singles chart.

Track listing
7" (CBS - BA3475) 
Side A "I Could Make You Love Me" - 2:52
Side B "Meela Polarmay" - 3:47

12"' (CBS - BA12212)
Side A "I Could Make You Love Me" (Metal Mix)
Side B "Meela Polarmay" (Extended Mix)

Charts

Weekly charts

Year-end charts

References 

1985 songs
1986 singles
Wa Wa Nee songs
Songs written by Paul Gray (songwriter)
CBS Records singles